Cyrtodactylus aunglini, also known commonly as the Kyauk Nagar Cave bent-toed gecko, is a species of lizard in the family Gekkonidae. The species is endemic to Myanmar.

Etymology
The specific name, aunglini, is in honor of Burmese conservationist Aung Lin.

Description

References

Further reading
Grismer LL, Wood PL Jr, Thura MK, Win NM, Grismer MS, Trueblood LA, Quah ESH (2018). "A re-description of Cyrtodactylus chrysopylos Bauer (Squamata: Gekkonidae) with comments on the adaptive significance of orange coloration in hatchlings and descriptions of two new species from eastern Myanmar (Burma)". Zootaxa 4527 (2): 151–185. (Cyrtodactylus aunglini, new species).

Cyrtodactylus
Reptiles described in 2018
Reptiles of Myanmar
Endemic fauna of Myanmar